José Agustín Aranzábal Askasibar (23 July 1946 – 30 December 2020), known as Gaztelu, was a Spanish footballer who played as a midfielder.

He spent his entire career with Real Sociedad, playing 308 competitive games and scoring 33 goals.

Club career
Gaztelu was born in Bergara, Gipuzkoa. As a young child, he received his nickname, meaning castle in Euskera, after a farm owned by his aunt. He signed with Real Sociedad in 1965 from his local club and, after just one season with the reserves, was promoted to the first team at the age of 20.

Gaztelu made his debut in La Liga on 8 October 1967, playing the full 90 minutes in a 0–0 away draw against Sevilla FC. He scored his first goal in the competition on 17 November of the following year, in another draw (1–1, at Deportivo de La Coruña); in early 1970, whilst playing with the Spain under-23 team in Italy, he suffered a serious injury that sidelined him for nearly two years.

Gaztelu scored a career-best seven goals (from 29 games) in 1973–74, helping the Txuriurdin to the fourth position. On 5 December 1976, he was decorated by Real Sociedad to celebrate his tenth season and, shortly after, scored twice – once through a penalty kick – to help to a 5–0 home win over Athletic Bilbao in the Basque derby.

Gaztelu contributed one match in 1980–81, as Real won their first ever national championship. In the process, he became the first player to achieve that feat as well as promotion from Segunda División in 1967, retiring at the end of the campaign at 35.

International career
Gaztelu won two caps for Spain, in as many years. His first came on 15 October 1969, as he started in a 6–0 rout of Finland in La Línea de la Concepción for the 1970 FIFA World Cup qualifiers.

Personal life and death
Gaztelu's son Agustín was also a footballer. A defender, he too played for Real Sociedad and Spain.

The former died in his hometown on 30 December 2020, aged 74.

Honours
La Liga: 1980–81
Segunda División: 1966–67

See also
List of one-club men

References

External links
Real Sociedad profile 

1946 births
2020 deaths
People from Bergara
Spanish footballers
Footballers from the Basque Country (autonomous community)
Association football midfielders
La Liga players
Segunda División players
Tercera División players
Real Sociedad B footballers
Real Sociedad footballers
Spain under-23 international footballers
Spain international footballers